Spin Me Round is a 2022 American dark comedy film co-written by Jeff Baena and Alison Brie and directed by Baena. It premiered at the 2022 South by Southwest festival on March 12, 2022. It was released on August 19, 2022, by IFC Films in theaters and by AMC+ on video on demand.

Synopsis
Amber, the manager of a restaurant chain in Bakersfield, California, wins an all-expenses trip to the franchise's educational immersion program in Pisa, Italy, as well as the chance to meet the chain's wealthy and charismatic owner, Nick. However, she finds a different adventure than the one she imagined.

Cast

Production
It was announced in May 2021 that Jeff Baena and his Horse Girl co-writer and star Alison Brie were reuniting for Spin Me Round, which they would co-write. Brie would star in the film along with Aubrey Plaza, Alessandro Nivola, Molly Shannon and Lil Rel Howery. Filming began in Italy in June 2021.

Release
Spin Me Round had its world premiere at the 2022 South by Southwest festival on March 12, 2022. It was released on August 19, 2022, by IFC Films in theaters and by AMC+ on video on demand.

Reception 
On Rotten Tomatoes, the film has an approval rating of 47% based on 86 reviews, with an average rating of 5.4/10. The website's critics consensus reads, "If it never quite lives up to its potential, Spin Me Round remains a dizzily diverting comedy elevated by Alison Brie and Aubrey Plaza's performances." On Metacritic, the film has a weighted average score of 58 out of 100 based on 23 critics, indicating "mixed or average reviews".

References

External links
 
 

2022 black comedy films
2022 LGBT-related films
2020s American films
American black comedy films
American LGBT-related films
Duplass Brothers Productions films
2022 independent films
Films directed by Jeff Baena
Films scored by Pino Donaggio
Films set in California
Films set in Lucca
Films set in Pisa
Films shot in Italy
LGBT-related black comedy films